Lance Solomon Reddick (June 7, 1962 – March 17, 2023) was an American actor and musician.  He was best known for playing Cedric Daniels in The Wire (2002–2008), Phillip Broyles in Fringe (2008–2013), and Chief Irvin Irving in Bosch (2014–2020). In film, he was best known for starring as Charon in the John Wick franchise (2014–2023) and David Gentry in Angel Has Fallen (2019).

He was also known for portraying Detective Johnny Basil on Oz (1997–2003), Matthew Abaddon in Lost (2004–2010), and Albert Wesker in the Netflix series Resident Evil (2022). He provided the voice and likeness for video game characters Martin Hatch in Quantum Break, Sylens in Horizon Zero Dawn and Horizon Forbidden West, and Commander Zavala in the Destiny franchise.

Early life
Lance Solomon Reddick was born in Baltimore, Maryland, the son of Dorothy Gee and Solomon Reddick. He attended Friends School of Baltimore. As a teenager, he studied music at the Peabody Preparatory Institute and a summer program teaching music theory and composition at the Walden School. Reddick studied classical music composition at University of Rochester's Eastman School of Music, earning a Bachelor of Music degree. He moved to Boston, Massachusetts in the 1980s. Reddick attended the Yale School of Drama in the early 1990s, receiving a Master of Fine Arts degree in 1994.

Career
Reddick was cast as Cedric Daniels in the HBO series The Wire, having auditioned also for the roles of Bubbles and Bunk Moreland. He joined ABC's series Lost in 2008, where he played Matthew Abaddon, an employee of Charles Widmore, in multiple episodes. He was the third of five actors from the HBO series Oz to star in the drama. The Lost producers Damon Lindelof and Carlton Cuse were interested in Reddick for the part of Mr. Eko, but he was busy filming The Wire.

Reddick released his debut album Contemplations & Remembrances in 2007, and in early 2008, he was cast in a key role in the pilot of Fringe in which his fellow Oz actor, Kirk Acevedo, also had a regular role. Reddick played Phillip Broyles, the head of an FBI department investigating paranormal activities. Reddick described this character as "a real hard-ass, but he's also one of the good guys." Like Lost, Fringe was co-created and produced by J. J. Abrams. There was some doubt about whether Reddick could appear in both Lost and Fringe in the 20082009 television season. However, Abrams stated that, even though Reddick was a series regular on Fringe, he would do episodes of Lost whenever required. Reddick appeared in the 2013 thriller White House Down. He starred in the YouTube web series DR0NE, where he was also credited as a co-producer.

In 2014, Reddick appeared as Charon in the action-thriller film John Wick, a role he has reprised in its two sequels. In July 2021, it was confirmed that Reddick would reprise his role in John Wick: Chapter 4. He voiced the character Commander Zavala in the 2014 and 2017 video games Destiny and Destiny 2, respectively.

Also in 2014, he started portraying Chief Irvin Irving in the Amazon Prime series Bosch. Comparing his three large roles as police commanders, Reddick said that Daniels, his character from The Wire, is "a cop at heart", while Broyles, his Fringe character, is "a soldier", and Irving "is the quintessential politician".

Reddick was a spokesman in television commercials for Cree LED Bulbs.

In 2016, Reddick was cast in the post-apocalyptic horror film The Domestics. The film was released on June 28, 2018. Reddick later starred in the 2018 horror thriller film Monster Party. He also voiced the character Sylens in the 2017 video game Horizon Zero Dawn and reprised his role in the sequel Horizon Forbidden West. In 2021, Reddick appeared in the film Godzilla vs. Kong. In 2022, Reddick portrayed Albert Wesker in the live action Resident Evil Netflix series, which was cancelled after one season.

He will appear posthumously as the Greek god Zeus in the upcoming series Percy Jackson and the Olympians, the Disney+ adaption of the book series of the same name, and Hellboy in the video-game, Hellboy: Web of Wyrd.

Death 
Reddick died from natural causes at the age of 60 on March 17, 2023, at his home in Los Angeles. Tributes were paid by colleagues and friends, including Reddick's The Wire co-stars Wendell Pierce and Isiah Whitlock Jr., The Wire creator David Simon, and his John Wick co-stars Keanu Reeves and Ian McShane. Players of the games Destiny and Destiny 2 visited Reddick's character, Commander Zavala, saluting him or sitting in silence side by side.

Filmography

Film

Television
{| class="wikitable sortable"
|-
! Year !! Title !! Role !! Notes
|-
| rowspan=2|1996 || New York Undercover || Oscar Griffin || Episode: "The Enforcers"
|-
| Swift Justice || Jim Stark || Episode: "Bad Medicine"
|-
| rowspan=2|1997 || The Nanny || Stage Hand || Episode: "Fair Weather Fran"
|-
| What the Deaf Man Heard || George Thacker || Television film
|-
| rowspan=2|1998 || The Fixer || Tyrell Holmes || Television film
|-
| Witness to the Mob || Foreman Trial #2 || Television film
|-
| 1999 || The West Wing || DC Police Officer || Episode: "In Excelsis Deo"
|-
| rowspan=2|2000 || Falcone || Det. Willis Simms || 3 episodes
|-
| The Corner || Marvin || 2 episodes
|-
| rowspan=2|2000–01 || Oz || Johnny Basil|| Recurring role
|-
| Law & Order: Special Victims Unit || Dr. Taylor || Recurring role
|-
| 2001 || Law & Order || Captain Gasana || Episode: "Soldier of Fortune"
|-
| rowspan=2|2002 || 100 Centre Street || Kwame Sekou || Episode: "Fathers"
|-
| Keep the Faith, Baby || J. Raymond Jones || Television film
|-
| 2002–08 || The Wire || Cedric Daniels || Main role
|-
| 2003 || Law & Order: Criminal Intent || Jack Bernard || Episode: "Probability"
|-
| 2004 || Law & Order || FBI Special Agent Jamal Atkinson || Episode: "City Hall"
|-
| 2005 || Independent Lens || James || Episode: "Brother to Brother"
|-
| 2005–06 || CSI: Miami || FBI Agent David Park || 3 episodes
|-
| 2007 || Numb3rs || Lieutenant Steve Davidson || Episode: "End of Watch"
|-
| 2008–09 || Lost || Matthew Abaddon || 4 episodes
|-
| 2008–13 || Fringe || Phillip Broyles || Main roleNominated—Saturn Award for Best Guest Starring Role on TelevisionNominated—Saturn Award for Best Supporting Actor on Television
|-
| 2010 || Svetlana || Lance || Episode: "Snatchengil for the Stars"
|-
| rowspan=2|2011 || Aqua Teen Hunger Force || Freedom Cobra || Voice, episode: "Freedom Cobra"
|-
| It's Always Sunny in Philadelphia || Reggie || Episode: "Frank's Brother"
|-
| 2012 || The Avengers: Earth's Mightiest Heroes || Falcon || Voice, 2 episodes
|-
| 2012–13 || Tron: Uprising || Cutler || Voice, 3 episodes
|-
| rowspan=4|2013 || Wilfred || Dr. Blum || Episode: "Perspective"
|-
| NTSF:SD:SUV:: || Senor Dicks || Episode: "TGI Murder"
|-
| Comedy Bang! Bang! || Angelfire || Episode: "Andy Samberg Wears A Plaid Shirt And Glasses"
|-
| The Eric Andre Show || Himself || Episode: "Lance Reddick; Harry Shum Jr."
|-
| rowspan=5|2014 || Beware the Batman || Ra's al Ghul || Voice, 3 episodes
|-
| American Horror Story: Coven || Papa Legba || 3 episodes
|-
| Intelligence || DCI Jeffrey Tetazoo || 5 episodes
|-
| The Blacklist || The Cowboy || 2 episodes
|-
| Key & Peele || Johnson Family Member || Episode: "Gay Wedding Advice"
|-
| 2014–21 || Bosch || Deputy Chief Irvin Irving || Main roleNominated—Saturn Award for Best Supporting Actor on Television
|-
| rowspan=2|2015 || Castle || Keith Kaufman || Episode: "Hollander's Woods"
|-
| Tim & Eric's Bedtime Stories || Joseph Zagen || Episode: "Tornado"
|-
| 2016 || Mary + Jane || David || Episode: "Rehab"
|-
| 2017 || Rick and Morty || Alan Rails || Voice, episode: "Vindicators 3: The Return of Worldender"
|-
| 2018–20 || Corporate || Christian DeVille || Recurring role
|-
| 2018 || American Horror Story: Apocalypse || Papa Legba || Episode: "Traitor"
|-
| 2019 || DuckTales || General Lunaris || Voice, recurring role
|-
| 2020 || Castlevania || The Captain || Voice, 2 episodes
|-
| 2020–22 || Paradise PD || Agent Clappers || Voice, recurring role
|-
| rowspan=2|2021 || America's Book of Secrets || Self || Host
|-
| Young Sheldon ||  Professor Boucher || Episode: "An Introduction to Engineering and a Glob of Hair Gel"
|-
|2022 || Resident Evil || Albert Wesker || Main role (8 episodes); final live-action television project
|-
| 2022–23 || Farzar || Renzo / Agent Clappers || Voice, main role; Season 1-2
|-
| 2023 || The Legend of Vox Machina || Thordak || Voice, recurring role; Season 2
|-
| 2024 || Percy Jackson and the Olympians || Zeus ||Post-production; Posthumous release
|}

Video games

Narrator

Discography
 2007: Contemplations & Remembrances''

References

External links

 
 
 Interview at HoboTrashcan.com

1962 births
2023 deaths
20th-century African-American people
20th-century American male actors
21st-century African-American people
21st-century American male actors
African-American male actors
American male film actors
American male stage actors
American male television actors
American male video game actors
Eastman School of Music alumni
Male actors from Baltimore
Yale School of Drama alumni
Yale University alumni